Guillou is a surname of Breton origin. It may refer to any the following people:

Guillou derives from the Breton name Gwilhoù which is a hypocorism of the name Gwilherm which is known as William in English.

 Charles Guillou  (1813–1899), American naval surgeon
 Fernand Guillou (1926–2009), French basketball player
 Jan Guillou (born 1944), Swedish writer and journalist
 Jean Guillou (1930–2019), French composer, organist, pianist, and pedagogue
 Jean Guillou (1931–2019), French gymnast
 Jean-Marc Guillou (born 1945), French footballer and football manager
 Patrick Guillou (born 1970), French football defender

See also
Guilloux

References

External links
Distribution of the surname Guillou in France

Surnames of Breton origin
Breton-language surnames